Tenetiše may refer to several places in Slovenia: 

Tenetiše, Litija, a settlement in the Municipality of Litija
Tenetiše, Kranj, a settlement in the Municipality of Kranj